Mike Craig or Michael Craig may refer to:

 Michael Craig (actor) (born 1929), British actor
 Michael Craig (footballer, born 1977), former Aberdeen FC player
 Michael Craig (footballer, born 2003), Reading FC player
 Michael Earl Craig, poet
 Mike Craig (field hockey) (born 1931), Australian Olympic hockey player
 Mike Craig (ice hockey, born 1962), Canadian ice hockey goaltender
 Mike Craig (ice hockey, born 1971), Canadian ice hockey winger who played in the NHL
 Mikey Craig (born 1960), musician

See also